The 1st Cuirassier Regiment was the oldest armoured regiment in the French Army, until it was amalgamated with 11th Cuirassiers Regiment. Today its traditions are carried on by the 1st Cuirassier Squadrons Group of the 1st-11th Cuirassier Regiment.

History

Origins
The regiment was a part of a small army raised by Bernhard of Saxe-Weimar in 1631 to help Gustavus Adolphus against the emperor during the Thirty Years' War. The regiment fought together with the Swedish Army at Breitenfeld, Rain and Lützen. With the death of Gustavus Adolphus and the disaster at Nördlingen the army of Bernhard of Saxe-Weimar entered French service on 26 October 1635. During this time the regiment was commanded by Colonel Trefsky and carried his name: Trefsky-Cavalerie (Trefsky Cavalry).

With Saxe-Weimer's army France began involving itself directly into the war, instead of only subsidizing the Swedes. The Trefsky regiment took part in the victories of Rheinfelden and Breisach, but with Bernard of Saxe-Weimer's death in the summer of 1639, the army loses its leader. Some of the Trefsky Cavalry and other regiments wished to return to Swedish service, but Guébriant, a future Marshal of France, persuaded the army, with the incentive of increased pensions, to remain permanently in French service.

At the time of the Revolution the Trefsky Cavalry was the only regiment was the only French regiment still to be equipped with cuirasses. It had been renamed Colonel-General in 1657. In 1791 it was again renamed as the 1er Régiment de Cavalerie; in 1801 renamed 1er Régiment de Cavalerie-Cuirassiers and in 1803 1er Régiment de Cuirassiers. With the first Bourbon restauration in 1814 the regiment became Cuirassiers du Roi, but it was restored to 1er Régiment de Cuirassiers by Napoleon during the Hundred Days. It was disbanded on 24 December 1815 at Loches after Napoleon's defeat. Re-raised in 1816 it was named Cuirassiers de la Reine (Queen's Cuirassiers).

The regiment was a part of the great cavalry charge in the Battle of Eylau.

Regimental war record during the revolution and empire
(Battles and Combats)
1792: Jemappes, Anderlecht, and Tienen.
1793: Maastricht, La Roer, Neerwinden, and Maubeuge.
1794: Mouscron, Pont-a-Chin, Roeselare, and the Capture of Mechelen.
1796: Rivoli and Tagliamento.
1799: Le Trebbia, La Secchia, Novi, and Genola.
1800: Mozambano.
1801: San-Massiano and Verone.
1805: Wertingen, Ulm, Hollabrunn, Raussnitz, and Austerlitz.
1806: Jena and the Capture of Lubeck.
1807: Hoff and Eylau.
1809: Eckmuhl, Ratisbonne, Essling, Wagram, Hollabrunn, and Znaim.
1812: La Moskowa and Winkowo.
1813: La Katzbach, Leipzig, Hanau, and the defense of Hamburg.
1814: La Chausee, Vauchamps, Bar-sur-Aube, Sezanne, and Valcourt.
1815: Ligny, Genappe, and Waterloo.

Restoration
When Louis XVIII returned to France again after the second abdication of Napoleon I, one of his first acts was to dissolve the entire French Army. The 1st Cuirassier Regiment was disbanded in Loches. According to General Susane its manpower went into the two new created Royal Guard cuirassier regiments and its depot was taken over by the 4th Cuirassier Regiment.

The Count of Béthune formed a new regiment on 27 September 1815. it was named the 1st Cuirassier Regiment or The Queen's Cuirassiers (French: Cuirassiers de la Reine). The regiment was organized with four squadrons and received its new standard on 28 August 1816 from the Duchess of Angoulme, in Compiegne.

Between 1816 and 1828, the regiment was successively garrisoned in Dijon (1819), Toul (1823), Sedan (1824), Nancy (1825), Joigny (1826), Vendôme (1827) and Tours (1828). When the 1830 revolution against the Bourbon monarchy broke out, the regiment was sent to Angers to ensure the maintenance of law and order, but did not have to actively intervene.

July Monarchy
The end of Bourbon rule in France also meant changes for the French Army. The regiment received a new commander: Colonel Count Ordener, on 5 August 1830. Several officers, who had been retired on half-pay since 1815 because of their Napoleonic sympathies, were able to return to the regiment. The regiment also lost the name: "Cuirassiers de la Reine" becoming simply the 1st Cuirassier Regiment.

Between 1830 and 1848, the regiment was garrisoned in various cities: Vendôme, Meaux (1830), Versailles (1831) and then Lille. The 1st Cuirassiers left the latter garrison to take part in the short campaign in Belgium in support of Belgian independence. When the regiment returned to France it was garrisoned in Compiegne (1832), Nancy (1833–1836), Paris (1837), Haguenau (1838–1842) and finally in Vesoul from 1843 to 1848.

During the French Revolution of 1848, the regiment was sent first to Mantes, then to Paris, to ensure law and order.

Second Empire
Under the Second Empire the cuirassier regiments of the French Army entered a period of relative neglect. As slow-moving heavy cavalry they were poorly suited for overseas warfare in Algeria, Mexico and China. Accordingly, the 1st Cuirassiers remained in peacetime garrisons for most of this period, intended for use as shock troops in a future European war.

The regiment's opportunity for active service came in 1870 with the Franco-Prussian War. The 1st Cuirassiers, forming part of the 2nd Cavalry Reserve Division, took part in a major but very costly charge at the Battle of Froeschwiller on 1 August 1870.

Between the World Wars
The twelve French cuirassiers that had existed in 1914 were reduced to six in 1919. As a regiment which had remained horse mounted throughout the war, the 1st Cuirassiers had had little opportunity to distinguish itself on active service after the opening stages of the conflict. It was accordingly amongst the cuirassier regiments disbanded. The regiment was however recreated as a mechanised unit in 1940.

Honours

Battle Honours
Jemmapes 1792
Austerlitz 1805
Eylau 1807
La Moskowa 1812
L'Avre 1918
La Marne 1918
Colmar 1945
Stuttgart 1945
AFN 1952–1962

Decorations
Croix de guerre 1914-1918 with one palm and one star.
Croix de guerre 1939-1945 with three palms.

References

External links
  Website about the Regiment

Regiments of the French First Republic
Regiments of the First French Empire
Regiments of the Bourbon Restoration
Regiments of the July Monarchy
20th-century regiments of France
01st
Military units and formations disestablished in 1815
Military units and formations established in 1816
Military units and formations disestablished in 1920
Military units and formations established in 1939
Military units and formations disestablished in 1940
Military units and formations established in 1943
Military units and formations disestablished in 1999
1816 establishments in France